The 2012 6 Hours of Castellet (6 Heures du Castellet) was the opening round of the 2012 European Le Mans Series season. It took place at Circuit Paul Ricard on 1 April 2012. Previously known as the Le Mans Series, it was the first race in the series' history where LMP1 was not contested in as LMP2 has taken over as the top prototype class. The Formula Le Mans (FLM) spec  class has been renamed to Le Mans Prototype Challenge (LMPC), the same name used in the American Le Mans Series. A new Grand Touring class was meant to participate in the opening round which was Grand Touring Challenge (GTC), but lack of entrants meant it did not participate.

Qualifying

Qualifying result
Pole position winners in each class are marked in bold.

Race

Race result
Class winners in bold.  Cars failing to complete 70% of winner's distance marked as Not Classified (NC).

References

External links

Castellet
6 Hours of Castellet
Six Hours of Castellet
April 2012 sports events in France